Khaled Hussain (born 11 November 1958) is a Kuwaiti middle-distance runner. He competed in the men's 800 metres at the 1980 Summer Olympics.

References

1958 births
Living people
Athletes (track and field) at the 1980 Summer Olympics
Kuwaiti male middle-distance runners
Olympic athletes of Kuwait
Place of birth missing (living people)